Scottish Folk Tales is a 1976 anthology of 18 fairy tales from Scotland that have been collected and retold by Ruth Manning-Sanders. It is one in a long series of such anthologies by Manning-Sanders.

Table of contents
Foreword
1. My own self
2. The Laird of Co
3. The shadow
4. The wee bit mousikie
5. Green caps
6. The Well at the World's End
7. The seal-wife
8. The little wee man
9. The Black Bull of Norroway
10. Whirra whirra bump!
11. Mester Stoorworm
12. Flitting
13. The Loch Ness Kelpie
14. Short Hoggers
15. Seven Inches
16. In a sack
17. The seal-hunter and the mermen
18. The Strange Visitor
Note: Inconsistencies in the capitalization of various title words are correct, per the book's contents page.

See also

Brownie
Fairy
Kelpie
Loch Ness
Merman
Sea serpent
Selkie

References 

1976 short story collections
Collections of fairy tales
Children's short story collections
British children's books
Methuen Publishing books
Scottish fairy tales
1976 children's books
1976 anthologies